The Offences against the Person Act 1861 (24 & 25 Vict c 100) is an Act of the Parliament of the United Kingdom of Great Britain and Ireland. It consolidated provisions related to offences against the person (an expression, which, in particular, includes offences of violence) from a number of earlier statutes into a single Act. For the most part these provisions were, according to the draftsman of the Act, incorporated with little or no variation in their phraseology. It is one of a group of Acts sometimes referred to as the Criminal Law Consolidation Acts 1861. It was passed with the object of simplifying the law. It is essentially a revised version of an earlier Consolidation Act, the Offences Against the Person Act 1828 (and the equivalent Irish Act), incorporating subsequent statutes.

Although it has been substantially amended, it continues to be the foundation for prosecuting personal injury, short of murder, in the courts of England and Wales. The Act was also adopted in British possessions. For example, New Zealand adopted the Act in 1866.

In England and Wales and in Northern Ireland, the sexual offences under the Act have all been repealed. For legislation referring to sexual offences, see the Sexual Offences Act 2003 and the Sexual Offences (Northern Ireland) Order 2008. In Northern Ireland, the 1861 Act was the basis for a ban on abortion until 2019 when it was amended by the Northern Ireland (Executive Formation etc) Act 2019.

Commentary
The Act as originally drafted listed specific methods whereby harm might be caused. For example, section 18 originally included an offence of shooting which could be committed with any of the specified intents. Sections 11 to 15 specified various means by which a person might attempt to commit murder.

In some cases, these reflected political issues then of great significance. For example, the Fenians were promoting their political case by leaving barrels of explosives in public places. Hence, sections 28 to 30 and 64 specifically address the problem, whether injury results or not. Similarly, children were throwing stones at passing railway trains, and these provisions remain in force.

As originally enacted, the Act had 79 sections. In England and Wales, 37 sections remain in force, namely sections 4, 5, 9, 10, 16 to 18, 20 to 38, 44, 45, 47, 57 to 60, 64, 65, 68 and 78. Of those, only sections 25, 34 to 36 and 78 have not been either partially repealed or otherwise amended. Different subsets of its provisions remain in force in Northern Ireland and in the Republic of Ireland.

Dangerous offenders

See the Criminal Justice Act 2003 for further provisions about sentencing for manslaughter and for offences under sections 4 and 16 to 47 of this Act.

Homicide

Sections 1 to 3 – Murder

Sections 1 to 3 dealt with the death penalty for murder and have been repealed.

In the Republic of Ireland, the references to murder in these sections were changed to references to capital murder by section 15 of the Criminal Justice Act 1964. They were repealed by section 9(1) of, and the second schedule to, the Criminal Justice Act 1990. But the repeal of section 1 did not affect the operation of sections 64 to 68.(s.9(2))

Section 1 – Penalty for murder

This section replaced the corresponding provision in section 3 of the Offences against the Person Act 1828 (9 Geo 4 c 31) and section 4 of the corresponding Irish Act (10 Geo 4 c 34).

Section 3 – Disposal of body

This section provided that the body of every person executed for murder was to be buried within the precincts of the last prison in which he had been confined, and that his sentence was to direct that this should happen. It replaced the corresponding provision in section 16 of the Anatomy Act 1832 (as amended by section 1 of the next mentioned Act) and replaced section 2 of the Hanging in Chains Act 1834 (4 & 5 Will 4 c 26).

Section 4

The penalty for offences under this section was increased by article 5(1) of the Criminal Law (Amendment) (Northern Ireland) Order 1977, but not in relation to offences "committed before the commencement" of that order (art.5(3)).

Soliciting to murder

This section creates the offence of soliciting to murder.

Conspiracy to murder
This section creates the offence of conspiracy to murder in the Republic of Ireland.

The repeal of as much of this section as related to the offence of conspiracy to murder for England and Wales was consequential on the codification of conspiracy by Part I of the Criminal Law Act 1977. The effect of this section, in relation to conspiracy to commit murder abroad, was preserved by section 1(4) of that Act.

The repeal of as much of this section as related to the offence of conspiracy to murder for Northern Ireland was consequential on the codification of conspiracy by Part IV of the Criminal Attempts and Conspiracy (Northern Ireland) Order 1983 (S.I. 1983/1120 (N.I. 13)).

Section 5 – Manslaughter
This section now provides that a person convicted of manslaughter in English law is liable to imprisonment for life or for any shorter term.

In England and Wales it now reads:

Repeals

The words "or to pay" to the end were repealed by Part I of Tenth Schedule to the Criminal Justice Act 1948. The other words were repealed by the Statute Law Revision Act 1892.

"Penal servitude for life"

This means imprisonment for life: See section 1(2) of the Criminal Justice Act 1948 and section 1(2) of the Criminal Justice Act (Northern Ireland) 1953 and section 11(2) of the Criminal Law Act 1997.

Other matters

Sections 6 to 8 have been repealed.  They respectively dealt with the form of the indictment for murder and manslaughter, with excusable homicide and with petty treason.

Section 6 replaced section 4 of the Criminal Procedure Act 1851 (14 & 15 Vict c 100). This section was repealed for the Republic of Ireland on 22 August 1924.

Section 7 replaced section 10 of the Offences Against the Person Act 1828.

Section 8 replaced section 2 of the Offences Against the Person Act 1828.

Sections 9 and 10: Jurisdiction over murder or manslaughter abroad
Section 9 gives the courts in England, Wales and Ireland extra-territorial jurisdiction over homicides committed by British subjects overseas. At the time of passing this was a more expansive definition, including the Dominions, but was restricted to just British subjects linked to the United Kingdom and its colonies by section 3 of the British Nationality Act 1948.) Section 10 gives these courts jurisdiction over fatal acts committed by British subjects overseas where the death occurs in England, Wales or Ireland, and jurisdiction over fatal acts committed in England, Wales or Ireland by anyone, including aliens, where the death occurs abroad. (The word "criminally" in that section has been held to exclude fatal acts done by aliens overseas although the death occurs in England, Wales or Ireland, since such acts are not punishable under the criminal law.)

Sections 9 and 10 respectively replace sections 7 and 8 of the Offences against the Person Act 1828. Section 10 was first enacted in 1728/29 by 2 Geo 2 c 21.

See also section 72 of the Domestic Abuse Act 2021.

Attempts to murder
Sections 11 to 15 dealt with attempts to murder and have been repealed.  See now the Criminal Attempts Act 1981.

Section 11 – Administering poison or wounding or causing grievous bodily harm with intent to murder

This section replaced section 2 of the Offences against the Person Act 1837 (7 Will 4 & 1 Vict c 85).

Section 12 – Destroying or damaging a building with gunpowder with intent to murder

This section replaced section 2 of the Arson Act 1846 (9 & 10 Vict c 25) (Malicious injuries by fire)

Section 13 – Setting fire to or casting away a ship with intent to murder

Section 14 – Attempting to administer poison, or shooting or attempting to shoot, or attempting to drown, suffocate or strangle with intent to murder

This section replaced section 3 of the Offences against the Person Act 1837.

Section 15 – Attempting to commit murder by any other means

Threats to kill

Section 16

The making of a threat to kill is an offence wherein the defendant intends the victim to fear it will be carried out. It is immaterial whether it is premeditated or said in anger.

Although the normal maximum sentence is ten years, offenders deemed to present a "significant risk" of "serious harm" to the public can now receive a life sentence under the Criminal Justice Act 2003.

Other threats of violence may be prosecuted summarily under section 4 of the Public Order Act 1986.

This section, as originally enacted, replaced the offence of sending, delivering or uttering a letter or writing threatening to kill or murder under section 1 of the 10 & 11 Vict c 66 (1847); the other offences under that section being consolidated elsewhere.

In Northern Ireland, this section was substituted by article 4 of the Criminal Law (Amendment) (Northern Ireland) Order 1977 (S.I. 1977/1249 (N.I. 16)).

In the Republic of Ireland, this section has been repealed and replaced by section 5 of the Non-Fatal Offences against the Person Act 1997.

Bodily harm
In the Republic of Ireland, sections 16 to 26 and 28 to 34 of this Act were repealed by section 31 of, and the Schedule to, the Non-Fatal Offences against the Person Act 1997

Section 17 – Impeding a person endeavouring to save himself or another from shipwreck

Shipping was the lifeblood of the Empire, thus, specific offences to protect seamen were common.

Wounding and grievous bodily harm

The offences under sections 18 and 20 of this Act are discussed in detail in the article grievous bodily harm.

Section 18

This section creates the offences of wounding and causing grievous bodily harm, with intent to cause grievous bodily harm, or to resist arrest. It is punishable with life imprisonment.

This section replaces section 4 of the Offences against the Person Act 1837.

Charges under this section are, under CPS guidance, reserved for crimes with very high intent which cause serious (potentially life-threatening harm) or showed malicious intent and caused really serious life-threatening or life-altering harm. The former offences under this section of shooting and attempting to shoot with intent have been repealed.  It is also no longer possible to charge the remaining offences of wounding and causing grievous bodily harm as having been committed with intent to maim, disfigure or disable as the relevant words have been repealed.

Section 19

This section defined the expression "loaded arms". The repeal of this section was consequential on the repeal of the offences of shooting and attempting to shoot with intent under sections 14 and 18 above.

Section 20

This section creates the offences of wounding and inflicting grievous bodily harm. The CPS guidance prefers this section to be used instead of section 18 when the harm done was more consequential rather than intentional, and/or the wounding was less serious. These are therefore less serious than the offences created by section 18 and carry a maximum prison sentence of 5 years.

This section replaces section 4 of the Prevention of Offences Act 1851 (14 & 15 Vict c 19). The offence of wounding either with or without a weapon or instrument under this section replaces the offence of stabbing, cutting or wounding under that section.

Garrotting, etc. – Administering chloroform, etc.

Sections 21 and 22: Attempting to choke, &c., to commit or assist in the committing of any indictable offence. Certain forms of attack have always been viewed with particular horror and the use of strangulation or drugs to render someone unconscious with a view to committing a crime require special treatment. Contemporary crime including date rape following the use of hypnotic drugs such as Flunitrazepam show that little has changed save that where the intended offence is of a sexual nature, separate legislation applies (see Sexual Offences Act 2003).

Section 22 replaces section 3 of the Prevention of Offences Act 1851.

Sections 23 and 24: Poisoning

Sections 23 and 24 cover the insidious forms of attack based on administering poisons or other dangerous chemicals and substances intending to injure another. Although rarely used today, the offences remain available should the specific circumstances arise, e.g. sending a package containing a dangerous substance to an embassy.

Section 25 permits a jury to find a person charged with an offence under section 23 guilty of an offence under 24.

Sections 23 to 25 respectively replace sections 1 to 3 of the 23 & 24 Vict c 8 (1860) (unlawful administering of poison).

Section 26 – Neglecting or causing bodily harm to servants

This section deals with the problem of neglect by an employer who failed to provide adequate food, clothing and accommodation for staff and servants. It is punishable on conviction on indictment with imprisonment for a term not exceeding five years.

This section replaces section 1 of the Poor Law (Apprentices, &c.) Act 1851 (14 & 15 Vict c 11).

The offence of assault under that section has been replaced by one of doing or causing bodily harm.

See also the summary offence under section 6 of the Conspiracy and Protection of Property Act 1875 which could be committed by neglecting to provide medical aid.

Section 27 – Abandoning or exposing a child under the age of two

The offence is in practice obsolete, as it has been superseded by the offence of cruelty to persons under sixteen under section 1 of the Children and Young Persons Act 1933.  The exception to this is that it can be committed by a person who does not have responsibility for the child within the meaning of the 1933 Act (assuming that such a person can unlawfully abandon or expose a child), and also by a person who is under sixteen.

Explosives, etc.

Sections 28, 29, 30, and 64 created a range of criminal offences supplementing the Explosive Substances Act 1883 and the Explosives Act 1875. These remain in force, although the Criminal Damage Act 1971 covers all aspects of the resulting damage to property and the Terrorism Act 2000 deals with possession for terrorist purposes.

Section 28 replaces section 3 of the Arson Act 1846 (malicious injuries by fire).

Section 29 replaces section 4 of the Arson Act 1846.

Section 30 replaces the corresponding offence under section 6 of that Act; the other offences under that section being consolidated elsewhere.

Section 31 – Setting spring guns with intent to inflict grievous bodily harm

This section addresses the problem of those who wish to protect their property with hidden traps.

This section replaces sections 1 to 4 of the 7 & 8 Geo 4 c 18 (1827) (An Act to prohibit the setting of spring guns, mantraps and other engines calculated to destroy human life or inflict grievous bodily harm).

Causing danger on railways

Sections 32 to 34 protect the railways from those who place obstructions on the line, throw stones at the passing trains, and generally endanger the passengers.

Section 32 replaced the offence of attempting to endanger the safety of passengers under section 6 of the Prevention of Offences Act 1851; the other offence being consolidated elsewhere.

Section 33 replaced section 7 of that Act.

Section 35 – Drivers of carriages injuring persons by furious driving
In England and Wales and Northern Ireland this section creates the offence of causing bodily harm by wanton or furious driving. It is repealed in the Republic of Ireland.

Assaults
In 1993, the Law Commission recommended that sections 36 and 37 and 39 and 40 be repealed. In 1980, the Criminal Law Revision Committee recommended that sections 42 to 45 be repealed.

Section 36 – Assaulting or obstructing a clergyman in the execution of his duties
In England and Wales and Northern Ireland, this section reads:

Repeals

The words omitted at the end were repealed by section 1(2) of the Criminal Justice Act 1948 and the Criminal Justice Act (Northern Ireland) 1953.

This section was repealed in the Republic of Ireland by section 31 of, and the Schedule to, the Non-Fatal Offences against the Person Act 1997.

"Divine service"

See Matthews v King [1934] 1 KB 505, 50 TLR 62, 30 Cox 27

"Misdemeanor"

See the Criminal Law Act 1967 and the Criminal Law Act (Northern Ireland) 1967.

Proposal for repeal

In 1985, the Law Commission said that this offence was no longer used and recommended that it be repealed.

Section 37 – Assault on any person authorised to preserve any shipwrecked vessel or goods
This offence is triable only on indictment and punishable with imprisonment for a term not exceeding seven years.

This section was repealed in the Republic of Ireland by section 31 of, and the Schedule to, the Non-Fatal Offences against the Person Act 1997.

Section 38
The marginal note to this section reads "Assault with intent to commit felony, or on peace officers, &c." It is unreliable.

This section was repealed for Northern Ireland by section 7(3) of the Criminal Justice (Miscellaneous Provisions) Act (Northern Ireland) 1968 (c.28) (N.I.). The offences of assault with intent to resist arrest and assaulting, etc. a peace officer under this section were replaced by section 7(1) of that Act.

Assault with intent to resist arrest

In England and Wales, this section creates the offence of assault with intent to resist arrest and provides the penalty to which a person is liable on conviction of that offence on indictment.

Assaulting, resisting or wifully obstructing a peace officer in the execution of his duty

This offence was repealed and replaced by section 51 of the Police Act 1964. An assault on a constable in the execution of his duty can now be prosecuted summarily under section 89(1) of the Police Act 1996.

Assault with intent to commit felony

The repeal of this offence was consequential on the abolition of the distinction between felony and misdemeanour.

Section 39 – Assaults with intent to obstruct the sale of grain, or its free passage
Immediately before its repeal, in England and Wales, this section read:

Repeals

The words "and kept to hard labour" were repealed for England and Wales by section 1(2) of the Criminal Justice Act 1948 and for Northern Ireland by section 1(2) of the Criminal Justice Act (Northern Ireland) 1953.

This section was repealed as it applied to England and Wales by section 1(1) of, and Group 5 of Part I of Schedule 1 to, the Statute Law (Repeals) Act 1989. It has not been replaced.

This section was repealed for the Republic of Ireland by section 31 of, and the Schedule to, the Non-Fatal Offences against the Person Act 1997.

Derivation

This section was derived from the corresponding provision in section 26 of the Offences against the Person Act 1828, and replaced both that provision and section 2 of the 14 & 15 Vict c 92 (which applied to Ireland). The words in square brackets in the text of section 39 above are different from those in section 26 of the Offences against the Person Act 1828.

This offence was previously created by the Corn Trade Act 1737.

Mode of trial

This offence could be tried at quarter sessions.

Proposals for repeal

In 1980, the Criminal Law Revision Committee recommended that sections 39 and 40 be repealed.

In a joint report dated 7 April 1989, the Law Commission and the Scottish Law Commission said that, between them, the offences of common assault, battery and affray, and the offences under the Criminal Damage Act 1971, made adequate provision for the punishment of any conduct that amounted to an offence under either section 39 or section 40. They said that the Home Office agreed that sections 39 and 40 served no further useful purpose. They recommended that both sections be repealed.

Section 40 – Assaults on seamen, etc
Immediately before its repeal, in England and Wales, this section read:

Repeals

Words replaced with "…" were repealed in England and Wales by s. 1(2) of the Criminal Justice Act 1948 and in Northern Ireland by the same section of the Criminal Justice Act (Northern Ireland) 1953.

The section was repealed in the first jurisdiction by section 1(1) (enacting Group 5 of Part I of Schedule 1) to the Statute Law (Repeals) Act 1989. It has not been replaced.

This section was repealed in the Republic of Ireland by section 31 of, and the Schedule to, the Non-Fatal Offences against the Person Act 1997.

Derivation

This section lately replaced the essentially identical section 26 of the Offences against the Person Act 1828. This in turn replaced section 2 of the Shipping Offences Act 1793.

Appeal

The  said either party could appeal to one of the superior courts of common law if they were dissatisfied with the determination of the justices as being erroneous in point of law.

Proposals for repeal

As to the recommendations of the Criminal Law Revision Committee, Law Commission, and Scottish Law Commission, see the preceding section's summary above.

Section 41 – Assault arising from combination

The repeal of this section was consequential on the decriminalisation of trade unions. See the Criminal Law Amendment Act 1871 and the Trade Union Act 1871.

Section 42 – Common assault and battery
In England and Wales, this section has been repealed and has been replaced by section 39 of the Criminal Justice Act 1988. The Criminal Law Act 1977, Schedule 6, increased the maximum fine to £200. (Entries relating to Offences Against the Person Act 1861 repealed by Criminal Justice Act 1988 (c. 33, SIF 39:1), s. 170, Sch. 8 para. 16, Sch. 16).

Section 39 of the Criminal Justice Act 1988 made the offence a summary only offences, and a person guilty of either assault or battery liable to a fine not exceeding level 5 (£5,000) on the standard scale and to imprisonment for a term not exceeding six months, or to both.

In Northern Ireland, this section was substituted by section 23(1) of the Criminal Justice Act (Northern Ireland) 1953 (c.14) (N.I.). Section 23(2) of that Act provides that any reference to this section in section 46 of the Summary Jurisdiction Act (Northern Ireland) 1953, or in any other enactment, is to be construed as a reference to this section as amended by that Act. This provision is said to be for the removal of doubt.

This section was repealed in the Republic of Ireland by section 31 of, and the Schedule to, the Non-Fatal Offences against the Person Act 1997.

Section 43 – Aggravated assault and battery

This section replaces section 1 of the Criminal Procedure Act 1853 (16 & 17 Vict c 30) (aggravated assaults upon women and children)

In England and Wales, this section has been repealed and has not been replaced. The Criminal Law Act 1977, Schedule 6, increased the maximum fine to £500.

In Northern Ireland, this section makes provision for the summary prosecution of aggravated assaults on women and children. The maximum fine for this offence was increased by section 60(2) of the Summary Jurisdiction and Criminal Justice Act (Northern Ireland) 1935 (c.13) (N.I.)

In the Republic of Ireland, this section was repealed by section 26 of, and the second schedule to, the Criminal Justice Act 1951 (No.2)

Section 44 and 45

In the Republic of Ireland, these sections was repealed by section 26 of, and the second schedule to, the Criminal Justice Act 1951 (No.2)

Section 46

This section was repealed in the Republic of Ireland by section 31 of, and the Schedule to, the Non-Fatal Offences against the Person Act 1997.

Section 47
In Queen's Printer copies of this Act, the marginal notes to this section read "assault occasioning bodily harm" and "common assault".

This section was repealed in the Republic of Ireland by section 31 of, and the Schedule to, the Non-Fatal Offences against the Person Act 1997.

Assault occasioning actual bodily harm

In England and Wales, and in Northern Ireland, this section creates the offence of assault occasioning actual bodily harm and provides the penalty to which a person is liable on conviction of that offence on indictment.

In the Republic of Ireland this offence has been replaced by the offence of assault causing harm under section 3 of the Non-Fatal Offences against the Person Act 1997.

Common assault

In England and Wales, the provision in this section relating to common assault has been repealed.

This is an either way offence. In Northern Ireland, it is written that a person who is convicted on indictment (before a Crown Court thus for more serious instances) of common assault is liable to imprisonment for a term not exceeding two years. This amounts to a doubling (of the maximum) by article 4(2)(b) of the Criminal Justice (No.2) (Northern Ireland) Order 2004.

Rape, abduction and defilement of women

Section 48 – Rape

This section provided that a person guilty of rape was liable to be kept in penal servitude for life or for any term not less than three years or to be imprisoned (with or without hard labour) for any term not exceeding two years.

It was a revised version of section 16 of the Offences against the Person Act 1828, incorporating the non-textual amendments made to that section by section 3 of the Substitution of Punishments of Death Act 1841 (4 & 5 Vict c 56) and section 2 of the Penal Servitude Act 1857. It replaced section 16 of the 1828 Act and the corresponding provision in section 3 of the 1841 Act, which were repealed.

In England and Wales, this section was repealed and replaced by section 1(1) of the Sexual Offences Act 1956. In Northern Ireland, repeal of this section was consequential upon the codification of the law relating to sexual offences by the Sexual Offences (Northern Ireland) Order 2008.

Section 49 – Procuring, by false pretences, false representations or other fraud, a girl under 21 to have illicit carnal connexion with any man

The expression 'illicit carnal connexion' means extramarital sexual intercourse.

This section replaced section 1 of the 12 & 13 Vict c 76 (1849) (procuring the defilement of women).

This section was repealed and replaced by section 2(1) of the Criminal Law Amendment Act 1885

Section 50 – Carnal knowledge of girls under 12

Section 50 replaced section 17 of the Offences against the Person Act 1828 and the corresponding provision in section 3 of the Substitution of Punishments of Death Act 1841 (4 & 5 Vict c 56) and incorporated the non-textual amendment made by section 2 of the Penal Servitude Act 1857.

Sections 50 and 51 were repealed by section 2 of the Offences against the Person Act 1875. They were replaced by sections 3 and 4 of that Act (also replaced) which had a broader scope.

Section 52 – Indecent assault upon a female

In England and Wales, this section was repealed and replaced by section 14(1) of the Sexual Offences Act 1956. In Northern Ireland, repeal of this section was consequential upon the codification of the law relating to sexual offences.

Section 53 & 54 – Abduction

Sections 53 to 56 were repealed in the Republic of Ireland by section 31 of, and the Schedule to, the Non-Fatal Offences against the Person Act 1997.

Sections 53 and 54 created various offences of abduction, including:

Forcible abduction of any woman with intent to marry or carnally know her. This would be charged as the common law offences of kidnapping and false imprisonment, or rape, and/or human trafficking under the Sexual Offences Act 2003.

In England and Wales, section 53 was repealed and replaced by sections 17 and 18 of the Sexual Offences Act 1956.
In England and Wales, section 54 was repealed and replaced by section 17(1) of the Sexual Offences Act 1956.
In Northern Ireland, repeal of these sections was consequential upon the codification of the law relating to sexual offences.

Section 55 – Abduction of a girl under 16

In England and Wales, this section was repealed and replaced by section 20 of the Sexual Offences Act 1956. In Northern Ireland, repeal of this section was consequential upon the codification of the law relating to sexual offences.

Child stealing

Section 56 created the offence of child stealing. In England and Wales, it has been repealed and replaced by the Child Abduction Act 1984.

Bigamy

Section 57 – Bigamy

This section creates the offence of bigamy. It replaces section 22 of the Offences against the Person Act 1828.

Abortion

Section 58 - offence of using drugs or instruments to procure abortion, replaced section 6 of the Offences against the Person Act 1837, and provides:

58. Every woman, being with child, who, with intent to procure her own miscarriage, shall unlawfully administer to herself any poison or other noxious thing, or shall unlawfully use any instrument or other means whatsoever with the like intent, and whosoever, with intent to procure the miscarriage of any woman whether she be or be not with child, shall unlawfully administer to her or cause to be taken by her any poison or other noxious thing, or unlawfully use any instrument or other means whatsoever with the like intent, shall be guilty of felony, and being convicted thereof shall be liable . . . to be kept in penal servitude for life . . .

Section 59 - offence of supplying or procuring poison or instruments for the purpose of criminal abortion, and provides:

59. Whosoever shall unlawfully supply or procure any poison or other noxious thing, or any instrument or thing whatsoever, knowing that the same is intended to be unlawfully used or employed with intent to procure the miscarriage of any woman, whether she be or be not with child, shall be guilty of a misdemeanor, and being convicted thereof shall be liable . . . to be kept in penal servitude . . .

"Unlawfully"
Contemporary effect: under sections 58 and 59 any act to procure abortion and anything done with intent to procure a woman's miscarriage (loss of her foetus or foeti) is unlawfully done unless authorised by section 1 of the Abortion Act 1967. An additional authority is given to the woman carrying foeti where a particular such pregnant woman is clinically shown to be likely to suffer severe detriment to herself or any of her foeti when born: subsection (1)(d).

"Felony" and "misdemeanor"
See the Criminal Law Act 1967.

Mode of trial 
The offences under section 58 and 59 are indictable-only offences.

Sentence 
An offence under section 58 is punishable with imprisonment for life or for any shorter term.

An offence under section 59 is punishable with imprisonment for a term not exceeding five years.

Current situation
Sections 58 and 59 continue to apply in England and Wales and Scotland. They were repealed as to the Republic of Ireland by section 5 of the Protection of Life During Pregnancy Act 2013, and in Northern Ireland by the Northern Ireland (Executive Formation etc) Act 2019.

Concealing the birth of a child

Section 60 – Concealing the birth of a child

This section creates the offence of concealing the birth of a child. It replaces section 14 of the Offences against the Person Act 1828.

Sexual activities

Section 61 – Buggery

This section abolished the nominal death penalty for buggery, and provided instead that a person convicted of this was liable to be kept in penal servitude for life or for any term not less than ten years. Latterly, non-military, domestic courts had always commuted the sentence. As contemporary legal commenters noted, the prior sentence of death recorded was a guarantee that death would not actually be inflicted. The new formula provided a clear, direct, by-judge sentencing band.

The sentencing band was reduced by section 1 of the Penal Servitude Act 1891 then by section 1 of the Criminal Justice Act 1948.

The section replaced section 15 of the Offences against the Person Act 1828.

In England and Wales the section was replaced by section 12(1) of the Sexual Offences Act 1956.

Section 62 – attempted buggery – assault with intent to commit buggery – indecent assault upon a male

In England and Wales this section was replaced by sections 15(1) and 16(1) of the Sexual Offences Act 1956.

In Northern Ireland this section as worded was proven to be incompatible with contemporary jurisprudence as to right to freedom from discrimination under the European Convention of Human Rights so was repealed by the Sexual Offences Act 2003.

In the Republic of Ireland, sections 61 and 62 were repealed as regards buggery between persons by the Criminal Law (Sexual Offences) Act 1993; they remain in force as regards buggery with animals.

Carnal knowledge

Section 63 defined the expression "carnal knowledge". In England and Wales, this section was repealed and replaced by section 44 of the Sexual Offences Act 1956.

Other matters

Section 64: This section was repealed in the Republic of Ireland by section 31 of, and the Schedule to, the Non-Fatal Offences against the Person Act 1997.

Section 65: search warrants for weapons, explosives and other articles intended for use in committing offences. This section was repealed in the Republic of Ireland by section 31 of, and the Schedule to, the Non-Fatal Offences against the Person Act 1997.

Sections 66 to 79 dealt with supplemental matters.

Section 68 provides that indictable offences under the Act committed within the jurisdiction of the Admiralty are subject to the punishments to which they would be subject if they had been committed in England. If this provision was not redundant in 1861, it is now.

Section 73: This section was repealed in the Republic of Ireland by section 31 of, and the Schedule to, the Non-Fatal Offences against the Person Act 1997.

Consequential repeals

The repeal of sections replaced by this Act was effected by the Criminal Statutes Repeal Act 1861 (24 & 25 Vict. c.95)

See also

 Offences Against the Person Act

References
 James Edward Davis, The Criminal Law Consolidation Statutes of the 24 & 25 of Victoria, Chapters 94 to 100: Edited with Notes, Critical and Explanatory, Butterworths, 1861, pp. v – xviii (introduction)  and pp. 243 to 289 (complete annotated text of the Act)  (from Google Books).
List of repeals and amendments in the Republic of Ireland from the Irish Statute Book

External links
The Offences against the Person Act 1861, as amended from the National Archives.
The Offences against the Person Act 1861, as originally enacted from the National Archives.
David Swarbrick: Offences against the Person Act 1861 partial text of the original Act.
Circumcision Reference Library: Offences against the Person Act 1861 amended text as at 18 April 2006; with notes as to which Acts repealed the sections no longer in force.
 A guide to the non fatal offences against the person 

United Kingdom Acts of Parliament 1861
1861 in England
1861 in Wales
1861 in Ireland
Acts of the Parliament of the United Kingdom concerning England and Wales
Acts of the Parliament of the United Kingdom concerning Ireland
Offences against the person
English criminal law
Irish criminal law
Irish abortion law
United Kingdom abortion law
LGBT law in the United Kingdom